Iceland sent a team to compete at the 2008 Summer Olympics in Beijing, People's Republic of China. With their silver medal in men's handball. they obtained their fourth olympic medal and their first team medal.

Medalists

Athletics

Men

Women

Badminton

Handball

Men's tournament

Roster

Group play

Quarterfinal

Semifinal

Gold medal game

Final rank

Judo

Swimming

Men

Women

References

External links
 ISI.is:Þátttakendur

Nations at the 2008 Summer Olympics
2008 Summer Olympics
Summer Olympics